Digama lithosioides is a moth of the family Erebidae first described by Charles Swinhoe in 1907. It is found in Ethiopia, Tanzania and Zimbabwe.

References

External links
Zwier, Jaap "Sommeria lithosioides Swinhoe 1907". Aganainae (Snouted Tigers). Retrieved April 18, 2020.

Aganainae
Insects of Tanzania
Moths of Africa
Moths described in 1907